Svyatoslav Yuryevich Shabanov (born 23 March 1993) is a Russian football defender. He plays for FC Spartak Tambov.

Club career
He made his debut in the Russian Second Division for FC Spartak Tambov on 26 April 2011 in a game against FC Lokomotiv Liski.

He made his Russian Football National League debut for FC Tambov on 22 October 2016 in a game against FC Tosno.

References

1993 births
Footballers from Tambov
Living people
Russian footballers
Association football defenders
FC Spartak Tambov players
FC Fakel Voronezh players
FC Tambov players
FC Metallurg Lipetsk players
FC Volgar Astrakhan players
FC Chita players